Molon ( or ) or Molo (died 220 BC) was a general and satrap of the Seleucid king Antiochus the Great (223–187 BC). He held the satrapy of Media at the accession of that monarch (223 BC); in addition to which, Antiochus conferred upon him and his brother Alexander the government of all the upper provinces of his empire. But their hatred of Hermeias, the chief minister of Antiochus, soon led them both to revolt in 222 BC. The two generals at first sent against them by the king were unable to oppose their progress, and Molon found himself at the head of a large army, and master of the whole country to the east of the Tigris.

He was, however, foiled in his attempts to pass that river by Zeuxis. However, Xenoetas, the general of Antiochus, who was now sent against him with a large force, having ventured to cross it in his turn, was surprised by Molon, and his whole army cut to pieces. The rebel satrap now crossed the Tigris, and made himself master of the city of Seleucia on the Tigris together with the whole of Babylonia and Mesopotamia.

The formidable character of the insurrection  now at last prompted Antiochus to march in person against the rebels. After wintering at Nisibis, he crossed the Tigris in 220 BC, and advanced southwards against Molon, who marched from Babylon to meet him. The right wing of Antiochus' army was commanded by Ardys. A pitched battle ensued, in which the desertion of the left wing of the rebel army at once decided the victory in favour of the king. Molon committed suicide to on the battlefield avoid capture. His body was impaled on the slope of the Zagros Mountains at the urging of Hermeias.

References
Polybius; Histories, Evelyn S. Shuckburgh (translator); London - New York, (1889)
Smith, William (editor); Dictionary of Greek and Roman Biography and Mythology, "Molon", Boston, (1867)
 Thomas Fischer: Molon und seine Münzen (222-220 v. Chr.), Bochum

Notes

Seleucid generals
Military personnel who committed suicide
Ancient people who committed suicide
3rd-century BC births
Seleucid satraps
220 BC deaths